The 2018 Moçambola is the 41st season of top-tier football in Mozambique. The season was initially scheduled to begin on 24 February 2018, bur was postponed to 3 March 2018. The season finished on 4 November 2018.

Final table

References

Moçambola
Mozambique
football